HGTV (formerly Home) is a British free-to-air television channel  interior home and garden-orientated lifestyle television channel broadcasting in the United Kingdom and Ireland, currently owned by Warner Bros. Discovery. The channel originally launched on 1 November 1997 as UK Style and then was rebranded to Home on 30 April 2009 and was rebranded to its current form on 21 January 2020. HGTV is broadcast 24 hours a day on Sky and TVPlayer. UK Style was transmitted by terrestrial provider ITV Digital 24 hours a day until the company's collapse in 2002. After a slight rebrand to UKTV Style, the channel made a return to terrestrial screens for a time in the mid-2000s as part of the now-defunct Top Up TV system. Home became available as a free-to-air linear service on Freeview from 1 March 2016.

History
The channel originally launched on 1 November 1997 as UK Style, broadcasting lifestyle programming from the archive of the BBC and from external producers. The channel was launched as part of the initial creation of the UKTV network, following the success of sister channel UK Gold. The channels success was noted when new channel UK Food was created with the sole purpose to free up the space on UK Style's schedule by transferring all food programming to the new channel.

In January 2003, another new channel called UK Bright Ideas was created to showcase programming from UK Style and UK Food on the digital terrestrial network Freeview. This was later extended to all networks, allowing repeats of some programmes to air on this channel only. On 8 March 2004, in line with the rest of the UKTV network, the channel changed its name to UKTV Style. The channel's schedule was further freed up by the creation of new channel UKTV Style Gardens in January 2005, which allowed the transfer of all landscape and gardening programmes to the new channel. The channel name was later shortened to UKTV Gardens in 2007.

As part of the rebranding of UKTV's channels to unique names and identities, UKTV Style was rebranded as Home on 30 April 2009 and repositioned to include programming based around home improvement, gardens and home lifestyle programmes. Other female lifestyle programmes were transferred to newly created channel Really, and all gardening programmes were transferred from UKTV Gardens to Home as part of the rebrand.

On 1 April 2019, it was announced that UKTV co-owner Discovery Inc. would acquire the BBC's stake in Home.

In June 2019, Discovery announced that Home would be rebranded as a local version of HGTV. This took place on 21 January 2020, the first programme to air on HGTV was Homes Under The Hammer at 7 am.

Timeshift service
The channel has a one-hour timeshifted service called HGTV +1. This was formerly named Home +1 and before that, UKTV Style +1. The service broadcasts the same content as the main channel, only one hour later. A two-hour timeshift called UKTV Style +2 was launched on 12 December 2007 on major platforms, replacing UKTV Bright Ideas on Sky. This channel closed on 15 September 2008 to make room for new entertainment channel Watch.

On-air identity

The channel's original identity revolved around the screen split in half horizontally with two objects coming together to form one object. Examples of these idents include an ornament added on top of a flower and still retains that image, wine pouring into a glass, with the base of glass formed out of pouring paint from a tin and a boater hat forming the bowl for some strawberries and cream. These idents were accompanied by a logo consisting of 'UK' inside a box and the channel name 'Style' written after on a line in upper case. The channel also had a digital on-screen graphic (DOG) of the same logo.

During July 2002, the channel relaunched in image along with the rest of the UKTV network. The box and line logos were replaced with the channel name stylised UK Style with a four-box pattern positioned to the right of the logo. This style had been adopted by the majority of the UKTV channels, with each channel's symbol representing the idents simplified and the channel focus in some ways. The boxes were arranged with one rectangle down the left-hand side, one running along the top half of the screen, a third in the centre bottom and a fourth in the bottom right corner. This arrangement was also reflected in the relaunched idents in 2001, with a different image in each section of the four-part arrangement. The idents were changed again in January 2003, with the same pattern used again. This time the pattern would appear integrated within the neutrally coloured home space, occasionally in shades of red and yellow. The pattern against the logo was also changed to shades of red and yellow at this time.

With the rebrand to UKTV Style, the idents changed to a neutrally coloured house interior and occupiers, which when looked through a mirror is improved and brightly coloured. This was however replaced in 2006 to a stream of purple moving across the screen. In both cases, the double lined UKTV Style logo would be aligned to the left of the screen. Then in 2007, the idents were changed to a new set featuring people painting or dancing in front of the purple background while their silhouette opens up showing pictures of various lifestyles before it closes back, followed by the UKTV Style logo. The channel also adopted purple as the channel's colour at the same time, and three different shades of the colour would appear at the ending of promotions for programmes on the channel and for promotions for the channel on the UKTV network itself.

Following the rebrand to Home, the idents now feature a virtual tour of a home of varying sorts, with various features pointed out by text, usually of a comical nature. These include identifying the pet cat as "5th Flatmate", dirt on the floor as "Old carpet, new mud", a carpet as a "trip hazard", some old suitcases as the "DVD cabinet" and an ornament having "survived 3 moves and 2 extensions". The home logo outside of the circle then forms up over the centre of the scene. Scenes from homes are also used in promotion graphics and 'stings' which show the channel name during advert breaks.

Home became HGTV on 21 January 2020.

Availability

Cable
Virgin Media : Channel 286 and Channel 290 (+1)
Virgin Media : Channel 209

Online
Discovery+ : Watch live

Satellite
Freesat : Channel 166 and Manual (+1)
Sky : Channel 158 and Channel 258 (+1)
Sky : Channel 162 and Channel 262 (+1)

Terrestrial
Freeview : Channel 44

Programming
The output of the channel shows lifestyle programmes, mainly gardening, home improvements and DIY shows, that are a combination of internally produced shows, repeats of shows from the BBC archive and international imports. Notable shows include:
60 Minute Makeover
A Place by the Sea
A Place in the Sun: Home or Away?
A Place in the Sun
Antiques Roadshow
Bargain Hunt
The Block
Car Booty
Cash in the Attic
Changing Rooms
DIY SOS
Escape to the Country
Extreme Makeover: Home Edition
Fantasy Homes By the Sea
Flog It!
Four in a Bed
Ground Force
Gutted
Homes Under the Hammer
The Hotel Inspector
How Clean Is Your House?
Living in the Sun
The Million Pound Property Experiment
Staying Put
Storage Hunters UK
To Buy or Not to Buy
Trash to Cash
Would Like to Meet

See also
 HGTV (US)
 Good Food
 UKTV Gardens
 UKTV Bright Ideas
 UKTV
 Television in the United Kingdom

References

External links
Home
Home on Facebook
UK Style at TVARK
Home at TVARK
UKTV at The TV Room

Television channels and stations established in 1997
Home improvement
Gardening television
1997 establishments in the United Kingdom
UK
UKTV
UKTV channels
Warner Bros. Discovery EMEA